rEFInd is a boot manager for UEFI and EFI-based machines. It can be used to boot multiple operating systems that are installed on a single non-volatile device. It also provides a way to launch UEFI applications. 

It was forked from discontinued rEFIt in 2012, with 0.2.0 as its first release.

rEFind supports x86, x86-64, and AArch64 architecture.

Features 
rEFInd has several features:

 Automatic operating systems detection.
 Customisable OS launch options.
 Graphical or text mode. Theme is customisable.
 Mac-specific features, including spoofing booting process to enable secondary video chipsets on some Mac.
 Linux-specific features, including autodetecting EFI stub loader to boot Linux kernel directly and using fstab in lieu of rEFInd configuration file for boot order.
 Support for Secure Boot.

Adoption 
rEFInd is the default Unified Extensible Firmware Interface (UEFI) boot manager for TrueOS.

rEFInd is included in official repositories of major Linux distributions.

Development 
GNU-EFI and TianoCore are supported as main development platforms for writing binary UEFI applications in C to launch right from the rEFInd GUI menu. Typical purposes of an EFI application are fixing boot problems and programmatically modifying settings within UEFI environment, which would otherwise be performed from within the BIOS of a personal computer (PC) without UEFI.

rEFInd can be built with either GNU-EFI or TianoCore EDK2/UDK.

Fork 
RefindPlus is a fork of rEFInd that add several features and improvements for Mac devices, specifically MacPro3,1 and MacPro5,1, and equivalent Xserve.

See also 

 GNU GRUB - Another boot loader for Unix-like systems
 Comparison of boot loaders

References 

Free boot loaders
Free system software
Macintosh firmware
Software using the BSD license
Software forks